The men's freestyle 61 kg is a competition featured at the Golden Grand Prix Ivan Yarygin 2018, and was held in Krasnoyarsk, Russia on the 26th of January.

Medalists

Results
Legend
F — Won by fall
WO — Won by walkover (forfeit)

Final

Top half

wrestler 1: Ismail Musukaev of Kabardino-Balkaria def. Rustam Abdurashidov of Dagestan by TF, (12–1)
wrestler 2: Aleksandr Bogomoev of Buryatia def. Yulian Gergenov of Buryatia (9–0)

Section 1

Repechage

References

Men's freestyle 61 kg